The Mosquito Net (Original title: La mosquitera) is a 2010 Spanish drama film about a dysfunctional family. It was written and directed  by Agustí Vila. It stars  Emma Suárez, Geraldine Chaplin, Eduard Fernández and Martina García.

Plot
A bourgeois Catalan family are in a state of disarray. They are Miguel, his wife Alicia, their son Lluís, and Miguel's elderly parents. Lluís collects stray cats and dogs that now dominate the family apartment, much to his father's chagrin. Alicia is incapable of challenging  the whims of her son and ponders separating from her husband. Miguel's mother, Maria suffers from Alzheimer's and her husband believes suicide may be the solution to their problems. Meanwhile, Alicia's friend, Raquel believes in a tough love method of parenting her daughter, albeit a method that leads to abuse.

Cast
Emma Suárez as Alícia
Geraldine Chaplin as María
Eduard Fernández as Miguel
Marcos Franz as Lluís
Martina García as Ana
Anna Ycobalzeta as Raquel
Àlex Brendemühl as Editor
Fermí Reixach as Robert
Àlex Batllori as Sergi

Production
Filming began in Barcelona on 9 November 2009. The film represents the linguistic texture of the city, with the use of both Spanish and Catalan. Madrid actress, Emma Suárez had to learn Catalan especially for her role.

Chaplin described the enthusiasm she had for the project, revealing that it was "the best script that I have ever read in my life".

Reception

The Hollywood Reporter described the film as "intriguing" and that "the questions it raises stick in the mind. It should engage audiences with a taste for complex urban quandaries presented with Spanish flair."

Suárez was nominated for the Goya Award for Best Actress and won the Best Actress Award at the Valladolid International Film Festival. The film also won the 2010 Crystal Globe at the 45th Karlovy Vary International Film Festival.

References

External links
 
The Mosquito Net on Eurochannel

2010 films
Spanish drama films
2010 drama films
Films about dysfunctional families
2010s Catalan-language films
2010s Spanish-language films
Crystal Globe winners
Films shot in Barcelona
2010 multilingual films
Spanish multilingual films